is a Japanese manufacturer of aluminium related products. It is one of the core Mitsubishi companies. Established in 1962, it produces aluminum, aluminum alloy mill products and fabricated products.

Shareholders
Mitsubishi Materials Corporation (MMC)
Mitsubishi Chemical Corporation
Mitsubishi Corporation
Mitsubishi Heavy Industries, Ltd.
The Bank of Tokyo-Mitsubishi, Ltd.
Mitsubishi Electric Corporation
Mitsubishi Estate Co., Ltd.
The Mitsubishi Trust and Banking Corporation
Meiji Yasuda Life Insurance Company
Tokio Marine & Nichido Fire Insurance Co., Ltd.

External links
  

Aluminium companies of Japan
Mitsubishi companies
Manufacturing companies of Japan
Manufacturing companies established in 1962
Non-renewable resource companies established in 1962
Japanese brands
Japanese companies established in 1962